Stringbean can refer to

A green bean or "string bean"
A runner bean
David "Stringbean" Akeman, (1915-1973) singer-songwriter, banjo player
Butler May, known as "Stringbeans", (1894-1917) American vaudeville and blues performer

es:Stringbean